The mixed doubles competition of the table tennis event at the 2007 Southeast Asian Games was held from 7 to 8 December at the Klang Plaza in Nakhon Ratchasima, Thailand.

Participating nations
A total of 34 athletes from nine nations competed in mixed doubles table tennis at the 2007 Southeast Asian Games:

Schedule
All times are Thailand Time (UTC+07:00).

Results

Round of 32
8 December 10:00

Final 16

References

External links
 

2007 Southeast Asian Games events
2007 in table tennis
2007